USS Donaldson (DE-44) was an  of the United States Navy during World War II. She was sent off into the Pacific Ocean to protect convoys and other ships from Japanese submarines and fighter aircraft. She performed escort and anti-submarine operations in dangerous battle areas and was awarded seven battle stars, a very high number for a ship of her type.

She was originally intended for transfer to the United Kingdom as BDE-44, was launched on 1 August 1943 by Puget Sound Navy Yard; sponsored by Mrs. J. J. Donaldson, mother of Lieutenant (junior grade) Donaldson; retained by the Navy; and commissioned on 1 December 1943.

Namesake
Trose Emmett Donaldson was born on 19 June 1914 in Tacoma, Washington. he was appointed a lieutenant (junior grade) in the U.S. Naval Reserve from the Merchant Marine on 25 November 1940. He served on the oiler  and on the repair ship  from 25 March 1941. On 13 December 1941 Donaldson was given command of the requisitioned tug Trabajador at Manila with the Navy's Inshore Patrol. On 25 February 1942 he was transferred to command the British salvage tug Henry Keswick, requisitioned by the U.S. Army during the continuing siege of Manila.

He was killed in action while commanding Henry Keswick on 9 April 1942, when the tug was set on fire by Japanese artillery and beached off Corregidor. Donaldson safely evacuated his crew to the shore and in the last boat, rowing for shore, he was killed instantly by an enemy shell.

Donaldson was awarded the Navy Cross for his heroism in December 1941 at Cavite, Philippine Islands, when he worked to evacuate ships and wounded and to fight fires during Japanese air raids. He was posthumously awarded the Distinguished Service Cross.

World War II Pacific Theatre operations
 
Donaldson arrived at Pearl Harbor on 9 February 1944 and five days later got underway for the invasion of the Marshall Islands. She screened a convoy to Roi Namur and gave local escort service there and at Eniwetok until returning to Pearl Harbor 25 March. From 23 April to 4 June she trained with submarines, most of the period serving as flagship for Commander, Escort Division 49.
 
Donaldson returned to Pearl Harbor on 15 August and five days later got underway to escort the Western Garrison Force for the assault and occupation of the Palaus, patrolling off Peleliu and Angaur from 20 to 22 September. She escorted unladen transports to Hollandia, New Guinea, then arrived at Manus on 26 September. That evening she and  assisted in bringing the fires on the merchantman  under control. Returning to Palau on 2 October, Donaldson made anti-submarine patrols and two escort voyages to the Russell Islands until 21 November.

Damaged after surviving a typhoon 
 
Arriving at Ulithi on 21 November 1944 Donaldson reported to the 3rd Fleet for duty as escort for the logistics group supporting the fast carrier task force. By able ship handling she survived the typhoon of 18 December, but lost three men overboard and suffered damage which was repaired at Ulithi from 24 December 1944 to 12 January 1945.

Supporting the Iwo Jima and Okinawa invasions 

She returned to duty with the 3rd Fleet fueling group operating in support of the assaults on Iwo Jima and Okinawa and the final strikes on the Japanese homeland and on 31 August she was detached to join a logistics unit in the Yellow Sea for the occupation of Jinsen, Korea.

Post-War decommissioning 
 
Donaldson sailed from Okinawa on 16 September 1945 for Saipan, Pearl Harbor and San Francisco arriving on 8 October. Donaldson was decommissioned on 5 December 1945, and sold on 2 July 1946.

Awards

References

External links

 

 

World War II frigates and destroyer escorts of the United States
Ships built in Tacoma, Washington
1943 ships